The Order of Glory was a Soviet military decoration established in 1943.

Order of Glory or Glory Order may also refer to

Order of Glory
 Order of Glory (Armenia)
 ; see Orders, decorations, and medals of Kazakhstan
 Order of Glory (Ottoman Empire)
 Order of Glory (Tajikistan)
 Order of Glory (Tunisia), a chapter of the Ottoman Order of Glory

Glory Order
 
 Glory Order (Azerbaijan)

See also
 Order of Honor and Glory; see 
 Order of Labour Glory
 Order of Maternal Glory